Christine is a 2016 biographical drama film directed by Antonio Campos and written by Craig Shilowich. It stars Rebecca Hall as news reporter Christine Chubbuck, covering the time period leading up to her committing suicide, the first to take place on a live TV broadcast. Michael C. Hall, Tracy Letts, Maria Dizzia, and J. Smith-Cameron are featured in supporting roles.

The film had its world premiere at the Sundance Film Festival on January 23, 2016. It was released in the United States on October 14, 2016, by The Orchard, and in the United Kingdom on January 27, 2017, by Curzon Artificial Eye. The film was positively received by critics, with many praising Hall's performance.

Plot
Sarasota, Florida, 1974: Reporter Christine Chubbuck is frequently at odds with her boss, Michael, who wants her to focus less on human-interest pieces and more on crime, which brings in news ratings. She also nurses a crush on her co-worker George Peter Ryan. After experiencing pains in her stomach, Christine's doctor tells her she needs to have an ovary removed, which will result in a decrease in the likelihood of her having children. At work, she learns the station's owner intends to promote some of the Sarasota team with a move to Baltimore.

Eager to earn the promotion, Christine buys a police scanner and begins listening to it, hoping to find grittier stories. Though her co-workers praise her stories, Michael tells her they are not what the station is looking for. Christine tries to do a piece combining documentary and recreation but is shot down by Michael, who also informs Christine that her segment will be replaced. Christine leaves the studio after screaming at Michael in front of the whole station, and him telling her to go home. After taking the weekend off, Christine comes back to work, telling George to ask to take her out so that they can have a conversation. At the restaurant, the pair confide personal secrets.

After dinner, George tells Christine he wants to help her and brings her to a Transactional Analysis self-help group. The group performs an exercise called "Yes, But", in which one person describes their problems and the other person offers solutions. During the course of the game, Christine reveals to her partner that she is a virgin but desperately wants a husband and a biological child. George drops Christine off at home and tells her he is being promoted to the Baltimore team. Alone, Christine drives to the home of Bob Anderson, the owner of the station, where she pretends she has a flat tire. They discuss the Baltimore promotions; Anderson reveals George asked for Andrea, the sports anchor, to be transferred with him, which devastates Christine.

At work, Michael gives Christine permission to do another segment. Christine reads out several minutes of local news. When footage of a crime scene jams and she's asked to stall, she shrugs it off, announces that the station will be airing a live suicide attempt, pulls out a revolver, and shoots herself in the head. Christine falls onto the floor, causing her disbelieving co-workers to realize it is not a prank. She is taken to the hospital, where she eventually succumbs to her injuries. Her mother and colleagues are devastated.

One of them, Jean, puts together Christine's news clippings into a memorial film before returning home, pulling an ice cream from the refrigerator, turning on the television, and singing The Mary Tyler Moore Show theme song, something she earlier told Christine she did as a way of coping with sadness.

Cast
 Rebecca Hall as Christine Chubbuck
 Michael C. Hall as George Peter Ryan
 Tracy Letts as Michael Nelson (a fictional version of the real  life WXLT-TV owner Bob Nelson)
 Maria Dizzia as Jean Reed
 J. Smith-Cameron as Peg Chubbuck
 John Cullum as Bob Andersen
 Timothy Simons as Steve Turner
 Kim Shaw as Andrea Kirby
 Morgan Spector as Doctor Parsons

Screenplay 
Craig Shilowich came up with the idea for Christine after coming across articles online that highlighted Chubbuck's story. He was "instantly fascinated" with it and what drove her to choose death by suicide on television. Shilowich had endured his own struggles with depression while at NYU in the wake of 9/11. He eventually dropped out of school. "I'd spend days on end walking my room, peeing out of the window, just to not have to deal with anybody," he told The Canadian Press in an interview. The depression lasted for about seven years and he says it went away the same way it came, with little explanation. He saw his story in Chubbuck's pre-suicide struggle and found himself "trying to piece it together" in a screenplay. He interviewed some of her former newsroom colleagues and read news stories to build what he could with hard facts. The rest was imagined.

Production
In May 2015, it was announced that Rebecca Hall, Michael C. Hall, Tracy Letts, Maria Dizzia, and J. Smith-Cameron had been cast in the film. Antonio Campos was signed to direct from a screenplay by producer Shilowich. Melody C. Roscher also produced, with Borderline Films' Josh Mond and Sean Durkin as executive producers.

Release
In December 2015, the first promotional image of Rebecca Hall was released on Indiewire.com. In January 2016, The Hollywood Reporter released more stills from the film. The film had its world premiere at the 2016 Sundance Film Festival on January 23, 2016. Shortly after, The Orchard acquired distribution rights to the film. The film was screened at the Toronto International Film Festival on September 8, 2016 and the BFI London Film Festival on October 6, 2016. The film was released on October 14, 2016.It was released in the United Kingdom on January 27, 2017, with the UK Blu-Ray releasing on February 27, 2017. No Blu-Ray has been announced for the United States; however, a DVD was released February 14, 2017.

Reception

Critical response
Christine received positive reviews from film critics, praising Rebecca Hall's performance. On review aggregator website Rotten Tomatoes, the film has an approval rating of 89% based on 131 reviews, with an average rating of 7.30/10. The site's critical consensus reads, "Rising on the strength of Rebecca Hall's gripping performance, Christine offers an empathetic look at its subject's public career and painful private life." On Metacritic, the film has a score of 72 out of 100 score, based on 32 critics, indicating "generally favorable" reviews.

Guy Lodge of Variety gave the film a positive review, writing: "Far from the austere death march it might threaten to be on paper, this is a thrumming, heartsore, sometimes viciously funny character study, sensitive both to the singularities of Chubbuck’s psychological collapse and the indignities weathered by any woman in a 1970s newsroom. Invigorated by a top-drawer ensemble, with Rebecca Hall discomfitingly electric in the best role she’s yet been offered, this should easily become Campos’ most widely distributed work to date." David Rooney of The Hollywood Reporter also gave the film a positive review writing: "On the evidence presented here, Chubbuck reads as dour and almost scarily intense on camera, so her professional aptitude is questionable even if her dedication is not. But Hall makes it impossible to look away from this portrait of a woman brought to the heartbreaking conclusion that she's beyond hope."

Accolades

References

External links
 
 
 

2016 films
2016 biographical drama films
American biographical drama films
British biographical drama films
Films about depression
Films about suicide
Films about television people
Films directed by Antonio Campos
Films set in 1974
Films set in Florida
The Orchard (company) films
2016 independent films
2016 drama films
Biographical films about journalists
Films set in the 1970s
2010s English-language films
2010s American films
2010s British films